The 2005 San Diego County Credit Union Poinsettia Bowl was a post-season college football bowl game between the Colorado State Rams and the Navy Midshipmen on December 22, 2005 at Qualcomm Stadium in San Diego, California, United States. The game, which the Midshipmen won with a score of 51–30, was the inaugural edition of the Poinsettia Bowl.

References

Poinsettia Bowl
Poinsettia Bowl
Colorado State Rams football bowl games
Navy Midshipmen football bowl games
December 2005 sports events in the United States
2005 in sports in California
2000s in San Diego